RoboBlitz is an indie puzzle action video game for Microsoft Windows through Steam and the Xbox 360 through Xbox Live Arcade. The game was developed by Naked Sky Entertainment and released on November 7, 2006. It was the first Unreal Engine 3 game alongside Gears of War to be released.

Plot
Blitz is a technician robot tasked with the maintenance of an orbital space cannon when it comes under attack from NEOD forces.  The game does not feature a detailed plot or background.  Instead the focus is on task completion with the assistance of another un-named and incapacitated robot similar to Blitz.

Gameplay
The player controls a robot who must navigate through six three part sectors to power up an orbital space cannon. Each sector has a multitude of enemies and a singular physics based puzzle per stage, as well as 'upgradium' pickups that can be used to expand Blitz' utilities, movement, and weaponry. Blitz can jump and interact with machines and elevators. It is able to grab objects likes barrels, carry them and use them to crush enemies as well as use weapons to shoot various enemies. Players can choose a more difficult game mode which when completed, gives access to bonus content.

Development
RoboBlitz uses a middleware tool developed by Allegorithmic to store its textures procedurally. This technique is used to make the game file size smaller, the actual game is less than 50 megabytes on Xbox Live.

Reception

RoboBlitz was met with critical acclaim and has received several awards and honors. The game was nominated for the 2007 Independent Games Festival for both the Seumas McNally Grand Prize and Excellence in Visual Art awards. The game was the Grand Prize winner for the 2007 Indie Games Showcase, a winner of the GameTap Indie Award, and "Best Digital Download Game of the Year" by Play Magazine.

Gallery

References

External links

RoboBlitz official website
Postmortem: Naked Sky Entertainment's RoboBlitz

2006 video games
3D platform games
Fictional robots
Independent Games Festival winners
Indie video games
Microsoft games
Naked Sky Entertainment games
Science fiction video games
Single-player video games
Unreal Engine games
Video games about robots
Video games developed in the United States
Video games using procedural generation
Windows games
Xbox 360 Live Arcade games